The Minister for Child Protection is a position in the Cabinet of Western Australia, first created in 1933 during the Second Collier Ministry.

The current Minister for Child Protection is Simone McGurk of the Labor Party, who holds the position as a member of the McGowan Ministry. The minister, who has generally held other portfolios in addition to child protection, is responsible for the state government's Department for Child Protection (DCP).

List of Ministers for Child Protection
Thirteen people have been appointed as Minister for Child Protection (or equivalent), with Leslie Logan's 11 years and 335 days during the Brand–Nalder Ministry the longest period in the position. The position and corresponding department have existed under several different names, and on several occasions been abolished entirely, with responsibility for the portfolio held by what is now the Minister for Community Services.

In the table below, members of the Legislative Council are designated "MLC". All others were members of the Legislative Assembly at the time of their service. In Western Australia, serving ministers are entitled to be styled "The Honourable", and may retain the style after three years' service in the ministry.

References

Child protection
Ministers, Child Protection